3-Methylfentanyl (3-MF, mefentanyl) is an opioid analgesic that is an analog of fentanyl. 3-Methylfentanyl is one of the most potent opioids, estimated to be between 400 and 6000 times stronger than morphine, depending on which isomer is used (with the cis isomers being the more potent ones).

Overview and history 

 was first discovered in 1974 and subsequently appeared on the street as an alternative to the clandestinely produced fentanyl analog α-methylfentanyl. However, it quickly became apparent that  was much more potent than α-methylfentanyl, and correspondingly more dangerous.

While  was initially sold on the black market for only a short time between 1984 and 1985, its high potency made it an attractive target to clandestine drug producers, as racemic  is 10–15 times more potent than fentanyl, and so correspondingly larger amounts of cut product for street sales can be produced for an equivalent amount of effort as for producing fentanyl itself; one gram of  might be sufficient to produce several thousand dosage units once diluted for sale.  has thus reappeared several times, at various places around the world.

The only country in the world with significant (200+ deaths a year, more than 10,000 addicts) abuse of this chemical is Estonia, where a dose of  costs 10 €, and other opiates are not generally available since the end of the 2000s. Approximately 1100 deaths from fentanyl and  abuse were recorded in Estonia between 2005–2013, compared to approximately 450 deaths in Sweden, Germany, UK, Finland and Greece combined during the same period.

Since 2016 fentanyl seizures in Estonia contains mostly carfentanil or cyclopropylfentanyl.

 has similar effects to fentanyl, but is far more potent due to increased binding affinity to its target site. Since fentanyl itself is already highly potent,  is extremely dangerous when used recreationally, and has resulted in many deaths among recreational opioid users ingesting the drug. Side effects of fentanyl analogs are similar to those of fentanyl itself, which include itching, nausea and potentially serious respiratory depression, which can be life-threatening. Fentanyl analogs have killed hundreds of people throughout Europe and the former Soviet republics since the most recent resurgence in use began in Estonia in the early 2000s, and novel derivatives continue to appear.

Use as chemical weapon 

3-Methylfentanyl was also reported by media as the identity of the anaesthetic "gas" Kolokol-1 delivered as an aerosol during the Moscow theater hostage crisis in 2002 in which many hostages died from accidental overdoses, 3-methylfentanyl was later ruled out as the primary agent used. The opiate antidote naloxone was on-hand to treat the victims of the crisis, but, whether due to their incarceration, lack of food, or water, or sleep, or due to the novel nature of the still-unconfirmed compound used, acute symptoms continued to develop, resulting in many fatalities despite the administration of naloxone.

Synthesis
A number of methods for synthesis have been published. The most recent is probably the method posted by the Serbian chemical society (2004).

There is another method, though, for constructing the N-Benzyl-3-methyl-4-piperidone in a 2-stage Michael reaction, followed by Dieckmann cyclization as per usual.

See also 
 3-Methylbutyrfentanyl
 4-Fluorofentanyl
 α-Methylfentanyl
 Acetylfentanyl
 Butyrfentanyl
 List of fentanyl analogues

References 

Synthetic opioids
Piperidines
Propionamides
Anilides
Mu-opioid receptor agonists
Designer drugs
Chemical weapons